The Pabbiring Islands are an archipelago off the west coast of South Sulawesi, Indonesia, scattered north-west of the city of Makassar.

Archipelagoes of Indonesia